Khed Shivapur is a village in the Pune district along National Highway 48.

References 

Villages in Pune district